Allocnemis leucosticta
Allocnemis mitwabae
Arabicnemis caerulea
Asthenocnemis linnaei
Asthenocnemis stephanodera
Calicnemia carminea
Calicnemia chaoi
Calicnemia chaseni
Calicnemia erythromelas
Calicnemia eximia
Calicnemia haksik
Calicnemia imitans
Calicnemia miles
Calicnemia miniata
Calicnemia mortoni
Calicnemia mukherjeei
Calicnemia nipalica
Calicnemia pulverulans
Calicnemia rectangulata
Calicnemia sinenis
Calicnemia sudhaae
Calicnemia uenoi
Calicnemia zhuae
Coeliccia acco
Coeliccia albicauda
Coeliccia ambigua
Coeliccia arcuata
Coeliccia axinocercus
Coeliccia bimaculata
Coeliccia boecttcheri
Coeliccia borneensis
Coeliccia brachysticta
Coeliccia campioni
Coeliccia chromothorox
Coeliccia coomansi
Coeliccia cyaneothorax
Coeliccia cyanomelas
Coeliccia ddidyma
Coeliccia dierli
Coeliccia dinoceras
Coeliccia doisuthepensi
Coeliccia dorothea
Coeliccia erici
Coeliccia exoleta
Coeliccia flavicauda
Coeliccia flavostriata
Coeliccia fraseri
Coeliccia furcata
Coeliccia galbina
Coeliccia kazukaoe
Coeliccia kimurai
Coeliccia lieftincki
Coeliccia loogali
Coeliccia marcostigma
Coeliccia megumii
Coeliccia membranipes
Coeliccia mingxiensis
Coeliccia montona
Coeliccia nemoricola
Coeliccia nigrescens
Coeliccia nigrohamata
Coeliccia octogesima
Coeliccia onoi
Coeliccia palawana
Coeliccia poungyi
Coeliccia pracritii
Coeliccia pyriformis
Coeliccia renifera
Coeliccia resecta
Coeliccia rossi
Coeliccia rotundata
Coeliccia ryukyuensis
Coeliccia sarbottama
Coeliccia satoi
Coeliccia schmidti
Coeliccia scutellum
Coeliccia sexmaculata
Coeliccia svihleri
Coeliccia tomokunii
Coeliccia uenoi
Coeliccia vacca
Coeliccia werneri
Coeliccia yamasakii
Copera annulata
Copera chantaburii
Copera ciliata
Copera imbricata
Copera marginipes
Copera rubripes
Copera superplatypes
Copera tokyoensis
Copera vittata
Cyanocnemis aureofrons
Denticnemis bicolor
Idiocnemis adelbertensis
Idiocnemis australis
Idiocnemis bidentata
Idiocnemis chloropleura
Idiocnemis dagnyae
Idiocnemis fissidens
Idiocnemis huonensis
Idiocnmeis inaequidens
Idiocnemis inornata
Idiocnemis kimminsi
Idiocnemis leonardi
Idiocnemis louisidensis
Idiocnemis mertoni
Idiocnemis nigriventris
Idiocnemis obliterata
Idiocnemis polhemi
Idiocnmeis pruinescens
Idiocnemis strumidens
Idiocnemis zebrina
Indocnemis orang
Leptocnemis cyanops
Lieftinckia isabellae
Lieftinckia kimminsi
Lieftinckia lairdi
Lieftinckia malaitae
Lieftinckia ramosa
Lieftinckia salomonis
Lochmaeocnemis malacodora
Mesocnemis dupuyi
Mesocnemis robusta
Mesocnemis singularis
Mesocnemis tisi
Metacnemis angusta
Metacnmeis secundaris
Metacnemis valida
Oreocnemis phoenix
Palaiargia alcedo
Palaiargia arses
Palaiargia carnifex
Palaiargia ceyx
Palaiargia charmosyna
Palaiargia eclecta
Palaiargia eos
Palaiargia ernstmayri
Palaiargia halcyon
Palaiargia humida
Palaiargia melidora
Palaiargia micropsitta
Palaiargia myzomela
Palaiargia nasiterna
Palaiargia obiensis
Palaiargia optata
Palaiargia perimecosoma
Palaiargia rubropunctata
Palaiargia stellata
Palaiargia tanysiptera
Paracnemis alluaudi
Paramecocnemis erythrostigma
Paramecocnemis stilla-cruoris
Platycnemis acutipennis
Platycnemis alatipes
Platycnemis agrioides
Platycnemis aurantipes
Platycnemis bilineata
Platycnemis brunneioctopunctata
Platycnemis congolensis
Platycnemis dealbata
Platycnemis echigoana
Platycnemis escherichi
Platycnemis flavipes
Platycnemis foliacea
Platycnemis foliosa
Platycnemis guttifera
Platycnemis hova
Platycnemis kervillei
Platycnemis latipes
Platycnemis longiventris
Platycnemis malgassica
Platycnemis mauriciana
Platycnemis melanus
Platycnemis nitidula
Platycnemis nyansana
Platycnemis pennipes
Platycnemis phasmovolan
Platycnemis phyllopoda
Platycnemis pierrati
Platycnemis protostictoides
Platycnemis pseudalatipes
Platycnemis rufipes
Platycnemis sanguinipes
Platycnemis sikassoensis
Platycnemis subdilatata
Platycnemis xanthopus
Rhyacocnemis leonorae
Rhyacocnemis prothoracica
Rhyacocnemis sufficiens
Risiocnemis antoniae
Risiocnemis appendiculata
Risiocnemis arator
Risiocnemis ashaninai
Risiocnemis atripes
Risiocnemis atropurpurea
Risiocnemis calceata
Risiocnemis confusa
Risiocnemis elegans
Risiocnemis erythrura
Risiocnemis flammea
Risiocnemis fuligifrons
Risiocnemis gracilis
Risiocnemis haematopus
Risiocnemis ignea
Risiocnemis inisa
Risiocnemis kraseri
Risiocnemis kiautai
Risiocnmeis laguna
Risiocnemis melanops
Risiocnemis moroensis
Risiocnemis nigra
Risiocnemis odobeni
Risiocnemis pistor
Risiocnemis plebeja
Risiocnemis polilloensi
Risiocnemis praeusta
Risiocnemis pulchra
Risiocnemis rolandmuelleri
Risiocnemis rubricercus
Risiocnemis rubripes
Risiocnemis seidenschwarzi
Risiocnemis serrata
Risiocnemis siniae
Risiocnemis tendipes
Risiocnemis varians
Salomoncnemis gerdae
Sinocnemis dumonti
Sinocnemis henanese
Sinocnemis yangbingi
Stenocnemis pachystigma
Thaumatagrion funereum
Torrenticnemis filicornis

References